Solar electric propulsion (SEP) refers to the combination of solar cells and electric thrusters to propel a spacecraft through outer space. This technology has been exploited in a variety of spacecraft by the European Space Agency (ESA), the JAXA (Japanese Space Agency), Indian Space Research Organisation (ISRO) and NASA. SEP has a significantly higher specific impulse than normal chemical rockets, thus requiring less propellant mass to be launched with a spacecraft. The technology has been evaluated for missions to Mars.

Overview 
Solar electric propulsion combines solar panels on spacecraft and one or more electric thrusters, used in tandem. There are many different types of electric thrusters, including a so-called ion thruster, a term that is often incorrectly used to describe all types of electric thrusters.

It is also possible to generate electricity from the Sun without using photovoltaic panels, such as with solar concentrators and a Stirling engine.

A 50 kilowatt SEP system was studied in the 2010s for a mission to an asteroid. In February 2012, NASA awarded a contract for a Solar Electric Propulsion Flight System.

An example of work on this type of technology is Advanced Electric Propulsion System.

The NASA Solar Technology Application Readiness (NSTAR) ion engine has been used with photovoltaic solar panels, which was tested on the Deep Space 1 mission along with Solar Concentrator Arrays (Launched in 1998 as part of the New Millennium Program).

SEP has been studied as a technology for a mission to Mars. In particular the high specific impulse of the ion engines could lower overall mass and avoid having to use nuclear technology for power when coupled with solar panels. A 1998 study for SEP for a human mission suggest that a human-sized spacecraft would need 600 to 800 kilowatts of electrical power coupled with ion engines with a specific impulse of 2000 to 2500 seconds.

Mission examples 
 BepiColombo mission to Mercury (launched)
 Dawn to asteroids Vesta and Ceres (completed)
 Deep Space 1 to asteroid Braille and comet Borrelly (completed)
 EMISAT military reconnaissance (launched)
 Hayabusa to asteroid Itokawa (completed)
 Hayabusa2 to asteroid Ryugu (primary mission completed, extended mission ongoing)
 Lunar Gateway space station orbiting the Moon (under construction)
 Psyche to asteroid Psyche (under construction)

Electric propulsion technologies 
 Resistojet rocket
 Ion thruster
 High Power Electric Propulsion
 Pulsed plasma thruster
 Hall-effect thruster
 Magnetoplasmadynamic thruster
 Microwave electrothermal thruster
 Field-emission electric propulsion
 Variable Specific Impulse Magnetoplasma Rocket (VASMIR)

See also 
 Batteries in space
 Liquid-propellant rocket
 List of spacecraft with electric propulsion
 Nuclear electric rocket
 Solar panels on spacecraft
 Solar sail
 Solar thermal rocket
 Stirling engine

References 

Solar power and space
Spacecraft propulsion